Havaran may refer to:
 Havaran, Hormozgan (هواران - Havārān)
 Havaran, Nik Shahr (حواران - Ḩavārān), Sistan and Baluchestan Province
 Havaran, Qasr-e Qand (حواران - Ḩavārān), Sistan and Baluchestan Province